Jang Su-jeong (born 13 March 1995) is a South Korean tennis player. 

Jang has won one singles title on the WTA Challenger Tour as well as ten singles and thirteen doubles titles on the ITF Circuit. On 11 July 2022, she achieved a career-high singles ranking of world No. 114. On 28 November 2022, she reached No. 105 in the WTA doubles rankings.

Career
Jang had a good career as a singles junior player, reaching her highest ranking in that category as world No. 68. Her best junior Grand Slam tournament was at the 2011 US Open, where she reached the third round. Her lone junior singles title was at the Yangdu International Junior Championships (Gangwon, 2008).

She won her first ITF Circuit title in Bundaberg, Australia on 30 March 2013, winning the doubles tournament with Lee So-ra. The pair defeated Miki Miyamura and Varatchaya Wongteanchai in the final. 

Her most successful performance to date came at the 2013 Korea Open, where she reached the quarterfinals with a three-set win over Ons Jabeur.

She qualified into the singles main draw of the 2022 Australian Open for her Major debut. She became the eighth South Korean woman to contest a Grand Slam main draw in the Open era, and fourth this century following Cho Yoon-jeong, Jeon Mi-ra and Han Na-lae.

She won her first WTA Challenger title at the 2022 Swedish Open defeating Rebeka Masarova in the final.

Performance timeline
Only main-draw results in WTA Tour, Grand Slam tournaments, Fed Cup/Billie Jean King Cup and Olympic Games are included in win–loss records.

Singles 
Current after the 2023 Thailand Open.

WTA Challenger finals

Singles: 2 (1 title, 1 runner–up)

Doubles: 1 (runner-up)

ITF Circuit finals

Singles: 25 (11 titles, 16 runner–ups)

Doubles: 23 (13 titles, 10 runner-ups)

Notes

References

External links
 
 
  

1995 births
Living people
Sportspeople from Busan
South Korean female tennis players
Tennis players at the 2014 Asian Games
Universiade medalists in tennis
Universiade bronze medalists for South Korea
Asian Games competitors for South Korea
Medalists at the 2015 Summer Universiade
21st-century South Korean women